The 1950–51 Challenge Cup was the 50th staging of rugby league's oldest knockout competition, the Challenge Cup.

The final was contested by Wigan and Barrow at Wembley Stadium in London.

The final was played on Saturday 5 May 1951, where Wigan beat Barrow 10–0 in front of a crowd of 94,262.

First round

Second round

Quarterfinals

Semifinals

Final

References

External links
 
Challenge Cup official website 
Challenge Cup 1950/51 results at Rugby League Project

Challenge Cup
Challenge Cup